The Film and Television Institute of India (FTII) is a film institute under the Ministry of Information and Broadcasting of the Government of India and aided by the Central Government of India. It is situated on the premises of the erstwhile Prabhat Film Company in Pune. It was established in 1960 and its alumni includes technicians, actors and directors in the film and television industry.

FTII is a member of the International Liaison Centre of Schools of Cinema and Television (CILECT), an organisation of the world's leading schools of film and television.

The centre will set up a new institute in Arunachal Pradesh as part of an initiative to tap the potential of the North Eastern region, Union Minister of State (Independent Charge) for Development of North Eastern Region, Dr. Jitendra Singh has informed.

FTI also sponsors a film award show named Global Indie Film Awards/Festival or GIFA.

History
The institute was established in 1960 and started its courses in 1961. The Television Training wing, which was earlier functioning in New Delhi, shifted to Pune in 1974. Thereafter, the institute became fully aided by the Ministry of Information and Broadcasting. In July 2011, Information and Broadcasting Minister Ambika Soni said that a bill in Parliament to develop the FTII into a 'Centre of Excellence' would be introduced. This would enable the institute to enjoy the academic status and privileges of a university.

In February 2015, Gajendra Chauhan was appointed as the chairman of the institute, which sparked protests by students at the institute.

On 18 August 2015, police — in a night-time crackdown — arrested striking students who confined FTII director Prashant Pathrabe and other staffers in his office for eight hours. The director claimed that students harassed and mentally tortured him. The students were released on bail. A video showing students surrounding the director and shouting was released by the management. In response the students released an undated video of cops manhandling students and breaking glass in the director's office, The striking students vehemently condemned the act by the Pune police to come and arrest students past midnight.

Courses
The institute offers three-year post-graduate diploma courses in film direction, editing, cinematography and audiography; two-year courses in acting and art direction; a one and a half year course in computer graphics and animation; a one-year course in feature film scriptwriting. One-year post-graduate certificate in direction, electronic cinematography, video editing and audiography are also part of the courses offered.

Management
The FTII is registered under Societies' Registration Act of 1860. The Society is headed by a president, who also functions as the chairman of the Governing Council, the Academic Council and the Standing Finance Committee. The Governing Council is constituted by election from among the members of the Society. The Governing Council is the apex body of the FTII and is responsible for making all major policy decisions of the institute. The council, in turn, appoints the Academic Council and the Standing Finance Committee, members of both of which are responsible for advising the FTII in policy matters related to academic affairs and financial matters.

A director serves as the institute's executive head and implements its policies and programmes. Prashant Pathrabe, a 1992 batch officer of Indian Information Service (IIS), has been given temporary charge as director following end of the term of DJ Narain. Gajendra Chauhan, the designated chairman of the governing council, is yet to join, owing to protest overs his appointment. The protests have been continuing for over 95 days but the logjam over appointment still remains.

List of presidents of FTII Society
Roshan Taneja
Anwar Jamal Kidwai (1 November 1974 – 30 September 1977)
S M H Burney (25 November 1975 – 30 September 1977)
R K Laxman (1 November 1977 – 30 September 1980)
Shyam Benegal (5 February 1981 – 30 September 1983, September 1989 – 30 September 1992)
Mrinal Sen (9 April 1984 – 30 September 1986)
Adoor Gopalakrishnan (1 September 1987 – September 1989, 21 November 1992 – 30 September 1995)
Mahesh Bhatt (20 November 1995 – 30 September 1998)
Girish Karnad (16 February 1999 – 10 October 2001)
Vinod Khanna (12 October 2001-February 2002, 4 March 2002 – 3 March 2005)
U R Ananthamurthy (4 March 2005 – 3 March 2008, 4 March 2008 – 3 March 2011)
Saeed Akhtar Mirza (4 March 2011 – 3 March 2014)
Gajendra Chauhan (9 June 2015 - 11 October 2017)
Anupam Kher (11 October 2017 – 31 October 2018)
B. P. Singh (13 December 2018 - 29 September 2020)
Shekhar Kapur (30 September 2020 - incumbent)

Notable faculty
 David Lean
 Istvan Gaal
 Mani Kaul
 Ritwik Ghatak
 Satyajit Ray
 Tom Alter

Notable alumni

Adoor Gopalakrishnan
 Daman Sood
Jaya Bachchan
Shatrughan Sinha
 Raza Murad 
Danny Dengzongpa
Kumar Shahani
Mani Kaul
Rakesh Bedi
Rakesh Pandey
Sanjay Leela Bhansali
Satish Kaushik
Tom Alter
Vimukthi Jayasundara

 Mukesh Khanna
 Rajkummar Rao

Wisdom Tree
Wisdom Tree in FTII is like an informal Master Class where students discuss topics with Filmmakers.

References

External links

 
 an Informal Space for FTIIans

Film schools in India
Film and Television Institute of India
Educational institutions established in 1960
1960 establishments in Maharashtra